Leaders of the University of North Carolina at Chapel Hill were known as Presidents until the formation of the Consolidated University of North Carolina in 1932.   Between 1934 and 1945, the title Dean of Administration was used for the leader of the university (subordinate to the President of the Consolidated University system), which in turn became Chancellor.  An asterisk (*) indicates an interim or acting appointment.

Presiding Professors

Presidents

Dean of Administration

Chancellors

References 

University of North Carolina At Chapel Hill leaders
North Carolina At Chapel Hill